J. Paul Boehmer (born October 30, 1965) is an American actor best known for his numerous appearances in the Star Trek universe. He appeared in Star Trek: Deep Space Nine, Star Trek: Voyager, Star Trek: Enterprise as well as video games Star Trek: Klingon Academy and Star Trek: Bridge Commander. His other appearances include The Thomas Crown Affair and The Good German.

Paul is a 1992 Masters of Fine Arts graduate of the Professional Theater Training Program at the University of Delaware.

External links
 
 

1965 births
American male video game actors
American male film actors
American male television actors
Living people
Male actors from Dayton, Ohio
University of Delaware alumni